Dadash is an Asian masculine given name. Notable people with the name include:

Dadash Babazhanov, Soviet machine gunner
Dadash Bunyadzade (1888–1938), Azerbaijani politician
Dadash Kazikhanov (born 1979), Russian football player
Dadash Rzayev (born 1935), Minister of Defense of Azerbaijan 

Azerbaijani masculine given names